The Supreme Court of the United States handed down eight per curiam opinions during its 2013 term, which began October 7, 2013 and concluded October 5, 2014.

Because per curiam decisions are issued from the Court as an institution, these opinions all lack the attribution of authorship or joining votes to specific justices. All justices on the Court at the time the decision was handed down are assumed to have participated and concurred unless otherwise noted.

Court membership

Chief Justice: John Roberts

Associate Justices: Antonin Scalia, Anthony Kennedy, Clarence Thomas, Ruth Bader Ginsburg, Stephen Breyer, Samuel Alito, Sonia Sotomayor, Elena Kagan

Stanton v. Sims

Ford Motor Co. v. United States

Unite Here Local 355 v. Mulhall

Hinton v. Alabama

Tolan v. Cotton

Martinez v. Illinois

Williams v. Johnson

See also 
 List of United States Supreme Court cases, volume 571
 List of United States Supreme Court cases, volume 572
 List of United States Supreme Court cases, volume 573

Notes

References

 

United States Supreme Court per curiam opinions
Lists of 2013 term United States Supreme Court opinions
2013 per curiam